Maudie is a diminutive form to the female given name Maud(e).

People
Maudie Bitar, Lebanese journalist and critic
Maudie Dunham (1902–1982), British actress
Maudie Edwards (1906–1991), Welsh actress, comedian and singer
Maudie Hopkins (1914–2008), American Civil War widow
Maudie Joan Littlewood (1914–2002), English theatre director
Maudie Prickett (1914–1976), American actress

Other uses
Maudie (film), a 2016 English-language biographical film about artist Maud Lewis
Maudie Mason, principal character of the "Maudie stories" of the 1930s and '40s
, a Norwegian tanker in service 1920–38